Geoffrey or Geoff Wilson may refer to:

 Geoff Wilson (Canadian politician) (born 1941), former member of the Canadian House of Commons
 Geoff Wilson (Australian politician) (born 1952), member of the Queensland Parliament
 Geoff Wilson (Australian footballer) (born 1940), Australian rules footballer
 Geoff Wilson (professor) (1938–2020), nuclear physicist
 Geoffrey Plumpton Wilson (1878–1934), English amateur footballer
 Geoffrey Wilson (cricketer) (1895–1960), English cricketer
 Geoffrey Wilson (British politician) (1903–1975), British Conservative politician

See also
 Jeff Wilson (disambiguation)
Jeffrey Wilson (disambiguation)